The  No. 1 Brisbane  is a future residential skyscraper to be located at 217-235A George Street on the corner with 52-58 Queen Street in Brisbane, Australia. The tower will rise to 274.3m (274m AHD) which is currently the maximum height allowed in Brisbane central business district.

Retail space is planned for all four levels of the podium, fronting streets and laneways on all four sides of the tower.
The 82-storey tower will include 534 apartments; 120 one bedroom, 284 two bedroom, 108 three bedroom, 20 four bedroom apartments and 2 penthouses. 
Recreation areas with swimming pool, gymnasium, function rooms and sun deck will be located on levels 5, 31-33, 54-55 and 73-74. 
The 12 levels basement will include 390 car park spaces and concierge drop off area.

Development application, lodged with the Brisbane City Council in June 2017, was approved in December 2017.

See also

List of tallest buildings in Brisbane

References

External links
 Building at The Skyscraper Center database 

Proposed skyscrapers in Australia
Skyscrapers in Brisbane
George Street, Brisbane
Queen Street, Brisbane